This is a list of Super Fight League champions in each weight division.

The SFL weight classes follow a full application of the Unified Rules of Mixed Martial Arts, as instated in 2001.

Current champions

Men's Divisions

Women's Divisions

Championship history (Male)

Heavyweight Championship
206 - 265 lb (93 to 120 kg)

Light Heavyweight Championship
186 - 205 lb (84 to 93 kg)

Middleweight Championship
171 to 185 lb (77 to 84 kg)

Welterweight Championship
156 to 170 lb (70 to 77 kg)

Lightweight Championship
146 to 155 lb (66 to 70 kg)

Featherweight Championship
136 to 145 lb (62 to 66 kg)

Bantamweight Championship
126 to 135 lb (57 to 61 kg)

Championship history (Female)

Women's Flyweight Championship
116 to 125 lb (52 to 56 kg)

Women's Bantamweight Championship (American Division)
126 to 135 lb (57 to 61 kg)

Super Fight League Champions, List Of